Eucalyptus fusiformis, commonly known as the grey ironbark or Nambucca ironbark is a tree that is endemic to eastern Australia. It has thick, blackish, "ironbark" on the trunk and branches, lance-shaped to curved adult leaves, flower buds in groups of seven, white flowers and conical to pear-shaped fruit.

Description
Flowering occurs between May and August and the flowers are white.

Taxonomy and naming
Eucalyptus fusiformis was first formally described in 1987 by Douglas Boland and David Kleinig in the journal Brunonia. The specific epithet (fusiformis) is derived from Latin words alluding to the fusiform or spindle-shaped flower buds.

Distribution and habitat
This ironbark grows in forest from about Kempsey in northern New South Wales to Mount Barney in southeastern Queensland.

References

fusiformis
Myrtales of Australia
Flora of New South Wales
Flora of Queensland
Trees of Australia
Plants described in 1987